Elophila difflualis is a moth of the family Crambidae. The species was first described by Pieter Cornelius Tobias Snellen in 1880. It is found in South-East Asia, in Australia and Réunion but has also be introduced to the United Kingdom.

The wingspan is 11–13 mm for males and 13–18 mm for females.

The larvae feed on Hydrocharitaceae (Valisneria sp.), Rosaceae (Synnema sp.), Alismataceae (Echinodorus sp.), Potamogetonaceae (Potamogeton sp.), Marsileaceae (Marsilea sp.)

References

External links

Acentropinae
Moths described in 1880
Moths of Asia
Moths of Africa
Moths of Australia
Aquatic insects